Lelow County (Polish: powiat lelowski) was an administrative unit (powiat), which existed for over 400 years, both in the Kingdom of Poland and the Polish–Lithuanian Commonwealth. Its history dates back probably to the late 14th century, ending in 1837. In the 15th century, when Lelow County was part of Kraków Voivodeship, its total area was almost . Among towns that belonged to it were Zawiercie, Myszkow, Czestochowa, Klobuck and Krzepice. The first known starosta of Lelow County was Zbigniew of Brzezie, mentioned in documents from 1408. The seat of the county was the town of Lelow. 

Some time in late 16th century, Lelow County was expanded, and by early 17th century, it had nine towns (out of which five had the status of royal towns), and 182 villages. The county belonged to Kraków Voivodeship until the Partitions of Poland. In 1795 it became part of Prussian New Silesia, administered from Breslau. Prussian authorities initially renamed it Lelow-Siewierz County, and in 1807, while in the Duchy of Warsaw, it was renamed Lelow-Pilica County. After the Congress of Vienna, the county was annexed into Russian-controlled Congress Poland. In 1837, Lelow County was liquidated.

Sources 
 Powiat Lelowski w latach 1392 - 1792, praca zbiorowa, zebrali i opracowali: Antoni Białowąs, Marian Nowak, Mirosław Skrzypczyk. Lelowskie Towarzystwo Historyczno Kulturalne 

Former counties of Poland
History of Lesser Poland